Shaadi Ka Laddoo is a 2004 Indian Hindi comedy film directed by Raj Kaushal. The film was released on 23 April 2004.

Plot Summary
Shomu and his wife Meenu are a happily married couple with two children. Shomu decides to travel to Britain for business purposes, as well as to meet his childhood friend, Ravi Kapoor. Once in Britain, Shomu finds himself getting close to single women, and realises that he is now ready for an extra-marital affair. His friend, Ravi Kapoor, on the contrary believes that Shomu is the luckiest man on earth, as he is in love with his wife, and their marriage is rock steady. Not trusting her husband, Meenu asks a U.K. based friend to check up on him. The friend reports back that Shomu is involved with a woman named Tara. Meenu decides to go to Britain as well and catch Shomu red-handed. In the meantime, Ravi meets with a waitress named Menaka Choudhary and decides to propose marriage to her, apprehensive that she too will turn him down. The stage is all set for sparks to fly, and emotions to rise.

Cast
Sanjay Suri as Som Dutta 
Mandira Bedi as Tara 
Aashish Chaudhary as Ravi Kapoor 
Divya Dutta as Geetu 
Samita Bangargi as Meneka Choudhary 
Sameer Malhotra as Geetu's Uncle 
Negar Khan as Sheena
John Clubb

Soundtrack

References

External links
 

Indian comedy films
2000s Hindi-language films
2004 films
Films scored by Vishal–Shekhar
2004 comedy films
Hindi-language comedy films